is a three-episode OVA anime series released by J.C.Staff between March 1990 through January 1992. The episodes are licensed for release in North America by Central Park Media and in the United Kingdom by ADV Films UK division.

Plot
Terumi is a lonely high school girl, teased for being mousy and homely by her classmates. Her childhood friend Kouichi is oblivious to her being in love with him. An ancient dragon lord offers to make her beautiful and popular in exchange for allowing him to possess her. Desperate, she agrees, and later rips apart the souls of the girls who once bullied her. Meanwhile, Kouichi is approached by another god, Susano, who wants to possess his body, so he can defeat the dragon. Reluctantly, Kouichi agrees and later meets a priestess named Sayoko who explains more to him about the current war between the gods. However, in order to kill the dragon, his host must die too leaving Kouichi struggling to figure out how to defeat the dragon spirits while also trying to save Terumi's life.

Media
Developed by J.C.Staff, the three episodes of Guardian of Darkness were directed and written by Osamu Yamazaki, and produced by Nobuhisa Abe and Shigeaki Komatsu. The three episodes were initially released to VHS format in Japan across three individual volumes. The first was released in March 1990; the last was released in January 1992.

The series is licensed for distribution in North America by Central Park Media—then US Manga Corps. They released the English dubbed across three VHS volumes under the name Takegami: Guardian of Darkness, with the first two released in October 1997, and the final episode released in February 1998. A box set containing all three volumes were also released in the same month. The episodes were released in a single DVD volume on January 19, 1999, with the original Japanese audio and English subtitled options added. The series was re-released to DVD on July 29, 2003, with the name Guardian of Darkness and new extras added.

The episodes are also licensed for release in the United Kingdom by ADV Films, and the English dubbed episodes were released for digital download at IGN's "Direct2Drive" service.

Episode listing

Reception
EX magazine's Charles McCarter felt the series had good character designs and particularly praised the dragon designs used in the series. He also praised the series musical soundtrack and the animation quality. However, he also felt the series claim that Terumi was inconsistent with her visually attractive character design, noting that "she is the most attractive character of the bunch (even before the hairstyle change)", and that the portrayal of the Shinto god Susanoo as the good guy as strange when the figure is normally a bad guy who "is typically shown in the myths...to be a bullying tantrum-thrower and all-around not-very nice guy". He also criticized the English voice actors in the Central Park Media dub for the mispronunciation of the Japanese names. As a whole, however, McCarter felt it was a fun series, particularly for fans of the occult and horror genres. Carlos Ross of THEM Anime Reviews agreed with McCarter about Terumi's character design being the cutest of the series rather than ugly, and the oddity of Susanoo being the good god in the series. However, Ross felt the series was unmemorable, plagued with writing inconsistencies, and bad animation. He also disliked the English dub, finding Lisa Ortiz's performance as Terumi to be "grating", the other voices forgettable and annoying for their mispronunciation of names. In his final summary, Ross felt that "poor animation and lackluster writing sabotage an interesting premise and potentially cool characters."

Anime Encyclopedia authors Jonathan Clements and Helen McCarthy offered the series mild praise for its English dub, particularly the demonic voice effects, but otherwise trashed the series as a "derivative tale of violent transformations...with a dose of misogyny and lackluster fight scenes."

References

External links

AnimeOnDVD.com/Mania.com Review
Star Bulletin review

1990 anime OVAs
Central Park Media
Horror anime and manga
J.C.Staff
Science fiction anime and manga